Unfaithful Music & Disappearing Ink is a memoir and spoken word album by Elvis Costello. The album earned Costello a Grammy Award nomination for Best Spoken Word Album.

References

2010s spoken word albums
2015 albums
Elvis Costello albums
Spoken word albums by British artists
Spoken word albums by English artists